The Meta-leadership framework and practice method is designed to “provide guidance, direction, and momentum across organizational lines that develop into a shared course of action and commonality of purpose among people and agencies that are doing what may appear to be very different work.” Meta-leadership has been “derived through observation and analysis of leaders in crisis circumstances” starting with the September 11 attacks in the U.S.The focus on national preparedness has subsequently been distilled for more general application, though it remains useful to crisis leaders particularly given current and persistent natural and man-made threats requiring the coordination of multiple agencies and organizations in preparation, response, and recovery.

Meta-leadership re-frames the practice of leadership by providing:

1)  A comprehensive organizing framework for understanding and integrating the many facets of leadership;

2)  A method for catalyzing collaborative activity;

3) A focus on improving function and performance across organizational and sector boundaries.

Origins 
The framework was developed by Leonard J. Marcus and Barry Dorn of the National Preparedness Leadership Initiative (NPLI), a joint program of the Harvard School of Public Health and Harvard's John F. Kennedy School of Government, and Joseph M. Henderson Chief of Staff at the Centers for Disease Control and Prevention and first published in 2006.

The need for such an expansive view of leadership was driven by the increased complexity of natural and manmade threats facing the United States. The challenge was illustrated by the inadequate response to Hurricane Katrina that “revealed profound system weaknesses.” Marcus, Dorn, and Henderson posited that “Leadership, as commonly understood, works to build the capacity within organizations. We premise here that a different brand of leadership is necessary to get beyond that silo thinking to achieve cross-agency and cross-government coordination of strategy and effort for national terrorism and emergency preparedness.”

As put forward in the first published article, effective meta-leadership was dependent upon the capacity of individual leaders to “..envision a new connectivity of strategy and effort and then find a way to communicate, inspire, and persuade broader participation.”; situational awareness, “seeing both the problems to be resolved as well as the people and assets that can be constructively brought to bear; and achieving connectivity, “…a seamless web of people, organizations, resources, and information that can best catch (detect and report), respond, (control and contain), and return to pre-event normal (recover) from a terrorist incident.”

Extensions and Evolution 
As a framework premised on integrating theory and practice through ongoing research, teaching, and field observation, meta-leadership has evolved over time as reflected in published work.

The original three-dimensional model meta-leadership framework and practice method was further developed and expanded to a five-dimensional model though work that included Isaac Ashkenazi: The person of the meta-leader, the situation, leading up, leading down, and leading across. Incorporating more recent feedback and research on events such as the 2013 Boston Marathon bombing response and the 2014-2015 response the Ebola outbreak in the United States, the model currently taught at the NPLI uses three dimensions similar to those in the original model, though each has been expanded and refined.

Earlier variants may still be in use in settings beyond the NPLI at Harvard and in publications. The current model in use at the NPLI builds upon but does not invalidate previous versions.

The Difference Between Leadership and Meta-Leadership 
As a framework and practice method, meta-leadership draws upon and integrates a wide range of extant leadership scholarship, including that on transformational leadership, shared leadership, followership, complex adaptive leadership, and others.

Meta-leadership is distinct in that it is focused on cross-cutting leadership that generates connectivity among disparate stakeholders in both intra- and inter-organizational settings. “Leadership refers to the recognized or expected span of authority that a person has in his or her formal role.” Meta-leadership is leadership employing influence over authority. “Meta-leaders…seek to influence and activate change well above and beyond established lines of their decision-making and control. These leaders are driven by a purpose broader than that prescribed by their formal roles, and are therefore motivated and capable of acting in ways that transcend usual organizational confines.

Meta-leaders think and perform differently. By taking a holistic view, they intentionally link and leverage the efforts of the whole community to galvanize a valuable connectivity that achieves unity of purpose and effort.

The Three Dimensions of Meta-Leadership 
 The person of the Meta-Leader (self-knowledge, awareness, and regulation): Meta-leaders develop high self-awareness, self-knowledge, and self-regulation. They build the capacity to confront fear and lead themselves and others out of the “emotional basement” to higher levels of thinking and functioning.
 The situation (discerning the context for leadership):  With often incomplete information, the meta-leader maps the situation to determine what is happening, who are the stakeholders, what is likely to happen next, and what are the critical choice points and options for action.
 Connectivity (fostering positive, productive relationships): The meta-leader charts a course forward, making decisions, operationalizing those decisions, and communicating effectively to recruit wide engagement and support. The meta-leader navigates the distinct dynamics and complexities of leading four facets of connectivity.
 leading down the formal chain of command to subordinates (within one’s silo), creating a cohesive high-performance team with a unified mission; 
 leading up to superiors, inspiring confidence and delivering on expectations; enabling and supporting good decisions and priority setting;
 leading across to peers and intra-organizational units (other silos) to foster collaboration and coordination;
 leading beyond by engaging external entities, including affected agencies, the general public and the media to create unity of purpose and effort in large-scale response to complex events.

Meta-Leadership in Practice 
Meta-leadership is particularly valuable in situations requiring connectivity and collaboration among entities, within the public sector (government agency to government agency), within the private sector (organization to organization) and between the public and private sector (where government agencies and private entities become inter-dependent to respond to widespread leadership demands). Meta-leadership is also increasingly valuable as an internal leadership framework for organizations, public and private, as large entities become less hierarchical and rely more heavily on inter-dependent intra-organizational units and extra-organizational partners. In the sphere of government emergency preparedness and response, Meta-Leadership acts as a unifying framework across different organizations and organizational units, intentionally connecting purpose and work to establish a shared course of action in times of critical need for coordinated response.

On a national level, there is a heightened need for effective cross-government and cross-sector collaboration with private and non-profit organizations in order to achieve large-scale preparedness. Meta-leadership principles can provide tools to break down obstacles to collaboration that are often the result of narrow leadership focus on the interests and needs of individual silos of activity.  Meta-leaders are able to imaginatively and effectively leverage system assets, information, and capacities, a particularly critical function for organizations with emergency preparedness responsibilities that are constrained by ingrained bureaucratic patterns of behavior.”

It is the core of the curriculum of the NPLI Executive Education Program for senior government leaders responsible for emergency preparedness and response. It has been widely adopted in public health agencies such as the Centers for Disease Control and Prevention, United States Department of Homeland Security, The Transportation Security Agency, the National Security Council of the White House, and many other public and private entities, to best meet the leadership challenges of unexpected or fast-changing situations.

Invited by the Federal Emergency Management Agency to look at government’s response to Hurricane Katrina, Marcus described the need for meta-leadership in any large-scale crisis, “Going forward, better communication and coordination among all levels of government, or ‘connectivity,’ will prove crucial. That means not just harnessing electronic technology to forge links among agencies, but also building relationships between people—transforming a culture that champions independent decision making into one that values cooperation.”

Similar observations to Hurricane Katrina emerged during analysis of the response to the Boston Marathon Bombings, a large-scale, multi-agency, time-constrained effort studied by NPLI faculty. An additional theory of study emerged from the leadership observed during the Boston Marathon Bombing Response that is now incorporated into the meta-leadership teachings of NPLI: swarm intelligence.

References 

Leadership